Lawrence Chaney (born Lawrence Maidment; 16 October 1996) is a Scottish Glasgow-based drag queen. They are best known for winning the second series of RuPaul's Drag Race UK, becoming the first Scottish drag queen to win across the franchise. Their role on the series later earned them the 2021 BAFTA Scotland Audience Award. As part of their Drag Race victory, Chaney was awarded their own online television series, later titled Tartan Around, which premiered in 2022.

Career
Chaney has professionally fulfilled their career as a drag performer since 2014 in Glasgow. In an interview with Metro, Chaney said their drag surname "Chaney" was inspired by 1920s prolific silent movie star Lon Chaney and explained that, "He was known as the man of a thousand faces and I'm known as the queen of a thousand faces, because I'm good at impersonation, stupid voices and general buffoonery."
  
In December 2020, Chaney was announced as one of twelve contestants competing on the second series of RuPaul's Drag Race UK. On 18 March 2021, Chaney was announced as the winner of the series, becoming the first Scottish and first plus-size winner of a Drag Race season hosted by RuPaul (the first ever being Drag Race Thailand season 1 winner Natalia Pliacam). As part of their Drag Race victory, Chaney was awarded their own online television series, later titled Tartan Around, which premiered in 2022.

In March 2021, Chaney, alongside their fellow RuPaul's Drag Race UK finalists Tayce, Bimini Bon Boulash and Ellie Diamond, was photographed and interviewed for The Guardian and later British Vogue. Lawrence also embarked on a UK Tour alongside A'Whora, Bimini Bon-Boulash, and Tayce for the United Kingdolls Tour with promoter Klub Kids in July 2021, and in February 2022, Chaney embarked on RuPaul's Drag Race UK: The Official Tour alongside the entire cast of the second series of RuPaul's Drag Race UK, in association with World of Wonder and promoter Voss Events. 

In April 2021, Chaney was interviewed for and featured on the cover of Attitude's "Tea Time Digital Special", in association with Taimi. Chaney was also a featured guest and panelist at the digital National Student Pride 2021 event.

In May 2021, Transworld announced they had acquired the rights to Chaney's forthcoming memoir, Lawrence (Drag) Queen of Scots: The Dos and Don'ts of a Drag Superstar.

Preceding RuPaul's Drag Race UK, Chaney has been a frequent collaborator with the BBC (especially BBC Sounds). On 21 August 2021, they presented the Saturday mid-morning slot on BBC Radio 1 from 10:30am, alongside Arielle Free and other drag queens, as part of "Drag Day".

Personal life
Chaney grew up in both Helensburgh in Scotland and Newbury in England. Chaney currently resides within the Gorbals area of Glasgow, Scotland. They have expressed their support for Scottish independence. 

Chaney struggles with their gender identity. In an article for the i, Chaney wrote: "I still don’t know if I am male, female, or somewhere in between. I think the best way to describe my gender is fluid, but this isn’t finite. I see myself as ever evolving and always discovering more about myself." Chaney uses they/them as pronouns. 

In June 2021, during the COVID-19 pandemic, Chaney revealed that they had tested positive for COVID-19.

Filmography

Television

Radio

Web series

Discography

As lead artist

As featured artist

Stage

Awards and nominations

References

External links

1996 births
Living people
20th-century Scottish LGBT people
21st-century Scottish LGBT people
People educated at Hermitage Academy
People from Helensburgh
RuPaul's Drag Race UK winners
Scottish drag queens
Scottish non-binary people